This is an incomplete list of squadron codes used by United States Army Air Forces (USAAF) aircraft operating in Europe during World War II.

Squadron codes

For each squadron code—painted on the plane's fuselage—the associated bombardment squadron (BS) is listed, along with the squadron's bombardment group (BG). Most commonly, a group would have four squadrons. Also listed is the group's tail code—the noted letter would appear inside the geometric shape (for example, ▲J means the letter J would appear inside a triangle). Some squadrons and groups also used specific color bands on the wings or empennage of their aircraft; such colorings are not presented here.

Notes:
 381st BG: some squadrons were assigned more than one code
 482d BG: Pathfinder squadrons with variable use of codes
 Some squadrons used colors rather than characters; these are listed below

Source:

Color codings
Notes:
 457th BG: colors on propeller hubs
 388th BG: two black bands on tail and wing (all squadrons)

See also
 List of RAF squadron codes
 USAAF unit identification aircraft markings

References

External links
 USAAF Training Aircraft Fuselage Codes of WW II

USAAF squadron codes